"Ring My Bell" is a song by Hitomi Yaida, released as her sixth Japanese single. It is also the first single taken from the album I/flancy.

It reached number four in the Oricon charts on June 4, 2002.

Track listing

Notes

2002 singles
Hitomi Yaida songs
Songs written by Hitomi Yaida
2002 songs